Proteorhodopsin (also known as pRhodopsin) is a family of transmembrane proteins that use retinal as a chromophore for light-mediated functionality, in this case, a proton pump. pRhodopsin is found in marine planktonic bacteria, archaea and eukaryotes (protae), but was first discovered in bacteria.

Its name is derived from proteobacteria (now called Pseudomonadota) that were named after Ancient Greek Πρωτεύς (Proteus), an early sea god mentioned by Homer as "Old Man of the Sea", Ῥόδος (rhódon) for "rose", due to its pinkish color, and ὄψις (opsis) for "sight".  Some members of the family, Homologous rhodopsin-like pigments, i.e. bacteriorhodopsin (of which there are more than 800 types) have Sensory Functions like opsins, integral for visual phototransduction. Many of these sensory functions are unknown – for example, the function of Neuropsin in the human retina.  Members are known to have different absorption spectra including green and blue visible light.

History 
Proteorhodopsin (PR or pRhodopsin) was first discovered in 2000 within a bacterial artificial chromosome from previously uncultivated marine Gammaproteobacteria, still only referred to by their ribotype metagenomic data, SAR86.  More species of Gammaproteobacteria, both Gram-positive and Gram-negative, were found to express the protein.

Distribution 
Samples of proteorhodopsin expressing bacteria have been obtained from the Eastern Pacific Ocean, Central North Pacific Ocean and Southern Ocean, Antarctica. Subsequently, genes of proteorhodopsin variants have been identified in samples from the Mediterranean, Red Seas, the Sargasso Sea, and Sea of Japan, and the North Sea.

Proteorhodopsin variants are not spread randomly, but disperse along depth gradients based on the maximal absorption-tuning of the particular holoprotein sequence; this is mainly due to the electromagnetic absorption by water which creates wavelength gradients relative to depth. Oxyrrhis marina is a Dinoflagellate protist with green-absorbing proteorhodopsin (a result of the L109 Group) that exists mostly in shallow tide pools and shores, where green light is still available. Karlodinium micrum, another dinolagelate, expresses a blue tuned proteorhodopsin (E109) which may be related to its deep water vertical migrations.  O.Marina was originally believed to be a heterotroph, however the proteorhodopsin may well partake in a functionally significant manner, as it was the most abundantly expressed nuclear gene and, furthermore, is dispersed unevenly in the organism, suggesting some organelle membrane function.  Previously the only eukaryotic solar energy transducing proteins were Photosystem I and Photosystem II. It has been hypothesized that lateral gene transfer is the method by which proteorhodopsin has made its way into numerous phyla.  Bacteria, archea and eukarya all colonize the photic zone where they come to light; Proteorhodopsin has been able to disseminate through this zone, but not to other portions of the water column.

Taxonomy 
Proteorhodopsin belongs to a family of similar retinylidene proteins, most similar to its archeal homologues halorhodopsin and bacteriorhodopsin. Sensory Rhodopsin was discovered by Franz Christian Boll in 1876. Bacteriorhodopsin was discovered in 1971 and named in 1973 and is currently only known to exist in the archea domain, not bacteria.  Halorhodopsin was first discovered and named in 1977.
 Bacteriorhodopsin and Halorhodopsin both only exist in the Archea domain whereas proteorhodopsin spans bacteria, archea, and eukaryotes.  Proteorhodopsin shares seven transmembrane α-helices retinal covalently linked by a Schiff base mechanism to a lysine residue in the seventh helix (helix G).  Bacteriorhodopsin, like proteorhodopsin, is a light-driven proton pump. Sensory Rhodopsin is a G-coupled protein involved in sight.

Active site 

In comparison with its better-known archaeal homolog bacteriorhodopsin, most of the active site residues of known importance to the bacteriorhodopsin mechanism are conserved in proteorhodopsin.  Sequence similarity is not significantly conserved however, from either halo- or bacterio- rhodopsin. Homologues of the active site residues Arg82, Asp85 (the primary proton acceptor), Asp212 and Lys216 (the retinal Schiff base binding site) in bacteriorhodopsin are conserved as Arg94, Asp97, Asp227 and Lys231 in proteorhodopsin. However, in proteorhodopsin, there are no carboxylic acid residues directly homologous to Glu194 or Glu204 of bacteriorhodopsin (or Glu 108 and 204 depending on the bacRhodopsin variant), which are thought to be involved in the proton release pathway at the extracellular surface.  However, Asp97 and Arg94 may replace this functionality without the close residue proximity as in bacteriorhodopsin.  The department of chemistry at Syracuse University decisively showed Asp97 cannot be the proton release group as the release happened at forcing conditions under which the aspartic acid group remained protonated.

Ligand 

The Rhodopsin haloprotein family shares the ligand Retinal, Vitamin A Aldehyde, one of the many types of Vitamin A. Retinal is a conjugated poly-unsaturated chromophore (polyene), obtained from carnivorous diet or by the carotene pathway (β-carotene 15,15'-monoxygenase).

Function 

Proteorhodopsin functions throughout the Earth's oceans as a light-driven H+ pump, by a mechanism similar to that of bacteriorhodopsin. As in bacteriorhodopsin, the retinal chromophore of proteorhodopsin is covalently bound to the apoprotein via a protonated Schiff base at Lys231. The configuration of the retinal chromophore in unphotolyzed proteorhodopsin is predominantly all-trans
, and isomerizes to 13-cis upon illumination with light. Several models of the complete proteorhodopsin photocycle have been proposed, based on FTIR and UV–visible spectroscopy; they resemble established photocycle models for bacteriorhodopsin. Complete proteorhodopsin based photosystems have been discovered and expressed in E. coli, giving them additional light mediated energy gradient capability for ATP generation without external need for retinal or precursors; with the PR, gene five other proteins code for the photopigment biosynthetic pathway.

Genetic engineering 

If the gene for proteorhodopsin is inserted into E. coli and retinal is given to these modified bacteria, then they will incorporate the pigment into their cell membrane and will pump H+ in the presence of light.  A deep purple is representative of clearly transformed colonies, due to light absorption.  Proton gradients can be used to power other membrane protein structures or used to acidify a vesicle type organelle. It was further demonstrated that the proton gradient generated by proteorhodopsin could be used to generate ATP.

Gallery

References

Bacterial proteins
Integral membrane proteins
Photosynthesis